Metolius is the name of a river in Oregon, USA, the Metolius River.

It may also refer to:

 Metolius Climbing, an American rock climbing gear manufacturer
 Metolius, Oregon, a city in that state named for the river
 Metolius Springs, the headwaters of the Metolius River